HLA-B*83 (B83) is an HLA-B allele-group composed of a single allele, B*8301. There is no useful serology associated with this allele.

It is found in a single Mbenzele Pygmy tribe of the Central Africa Republic at 1.5%. B*8301 appears to be the result of the replacement of exon 2 from B*4402 with exon 2 from B*5603.   (For terminology help see: HLA-serotype tutorial)

References

8